The Baalade, also called Togga Baalade is one of wettest canyons (Tog or  الوادي) in Somalia, and one of the longest valleys in the country. Its sources starting from the Cal Miskaad mountains and ended up into Red Sea near the western outskirts of Bosaso town. The valley supports variety grazing methods and seasonal vegetable firms. It is also a tourist destination, hosting number of tour destinations, Gaaca is among graceful places of the valley.
 
There are villages found on the banks of the valley these include Conqor, Riyi heshay, Gubato, and Gerible.

A number of poems refer to the valley, these poems reflect valley significances in particularly its bulk and perennial supply of water. One the poems reads "Baalade Biyaa laga Helloo lagu barwaaqoowye". That meant "Baalade owns ever flowing water streams.

Baalade's role in the Economy
The valley's grass firms host tens of thousands of commercial livestock all summer times each year. At that time, shipping companies suspend exporting and importing of all commodities due to the adverse weather such as severe winds and strong waves that is unfavoring maritime transportations to have their normal work, during that time it is locally known as Bad-xiran, and livestock dealers rush to rent grass firms for grazing and sustaining livestock betterment.

These commercial grass firms play critical role in sustaining animal health and to be fit enough for commercial purposes.

External links
 Balade, Somalia

References

Landforms of Somalia
Populated places in Bari, Somalia